The Culpeper Star-Exponent is a daily newspaper serving Culpeper County, Virginia, United States, published five days a week. It is owned by Lee Enterprises.

History
The first edition of the newspaper was published by Angus McDonald Green, on April 15, 1881 as the Culpeper Exponent.
 
In 1953, the Exponent merged with its archrival, The Virginia Star (founded in 1919), to create the Star-Exponent. Angus’ brother Raleigh Travers Green edited the paper from 1897 until he died in 1946.
 
Angus McDonald Green’s grandson, Angus Green, fought in World War II. He studied journalism on the GI Bill, then teamed up with his father, WWI veteran James W. Green, at his Orange County Review.
 
By the late 1960s, the fourth-generation enterprise also owned the Madison County Eagle, Greene County Record and the Rappahannock County News.
 
Angus toiled 50 years in community journalism and published local history books under Green Tree Press in the 1970s. In the early 1980s, the Green family sold its newspapers, later bought by Media General of Richmond.
 
In 2012, BH Media Group purchased the Star-Exponent, after which it was bought by Lee Enterprises in February, 2020. Today Star-Exponent staff members cover local news and sports in Culpeper County and neighboring localities.

References

External links 
 

Daily newspapers published in Virginia
Culpeper County, Virginia
Lee Enterprises publications
1881 establishments in Virginia
Publications established in 1881